Tony Braunagel is an American drummer, producer, and songwriter from Houston, Texas, United States, who is based in Los Angeles, California. Braunagel has played on many film scores and television shows as well as numerous albums as a musician, composer and producer. He is best known as a session drummer and/or percussionist of over 200 albums including those of Otis Rush, Eric Burdon, Johnny Nash, Coco Montoya, Lucky Peterson, as well as Grammy winning albums of Bonnie Raitt, Taj Mahal, Buddy Guy (percussion) and for performing live with dozens of music icons including Bonnie Raitt, Rickie Lee Jones, BB King, Lightnin’ Hopkins, John Lee Hooker, Robert Cray, Bette Midler, Lyle Lovett, and Taj Mahal to name just a few.

Braunagel's recording and performing career encompasses numerous and diverse rhythms and drum styles, but he is most known for Rhythm and Blues, Blues, Americana Rock ‘n’ Roll, Blues shuffle, Back Beat, as well as his own blend of Reggae and West African rhythms.  

Several of the albums produced by Braunagel have been nominated for and won Grammy and Blues Music Awards, reached Billboard charts, Living Blues charts, Roots & Music reports, and many Blues blog charts around the world, including albums by artists such as Taj Mahal, Eric Burdon, Coco Montoya, Danielle Nicole, Phantom Blues Band, and Curtis Salgado.

Early life
Anthony Michael Braunagel grew up in Houston, Texas, United States. His father was a country music fan, played some guitar, and surrounded him with music. Braunagel's first experience on the drums was playing his cousin's drumkit as a child, before being mentored by his neighbor (now life-long friend) Willie Ornelas.

At the age of 15 he bought his first drumkit from Ornelas and performed live for the first time shortly thereafter when Ornelas got him (actually, more like shoved him into) his first nightclub gig. Soon after, he became involved in the then-upcoming Houston R&B scene, honing his skills by playing in local joints and nightclubs.

Performance career 
Braunagel's early drumming career included playing in several local bands, such as Soul Brothers Incorporated, The Jokers, and Buttermilk Bottom. The latter got a record deal with Polydor and released a single. After the demise of Buttermilk Bottom, he then teamed up with Andy Chapman (vocals), Jimmy Don Smith (guitar) and then David Kealey (guitar), Michael Montgomery (keyboards), and Terry Wilson (bass) to form The Bloontz All Star Blues Band. In 1971, the band moved to New York under the auspices of producer Ron Johnsen, shortening their name to Bloontz and scoring a contract with the Evolution label.

Bloontz recorded one album at Electric Lady Studios, after which in 1973 Braunagel and Wilson toured with Johnny Nash becoming part of his latest Sons of the Jungle line up.

Braunagel wrote a song for Johnny Nash's Celebrate Life album in 1974 called "Standing in the Rain". Soon after, Braunagel with his battery mate, bassist Wilson, accepted an offer from Island Records to move to London in order to work with John "Rabbit" Bundrick, and several other Island artists. While in London, he was the house band drummer for Island Records as the Texas Rhythm Section along with Wilson on bass.

While in London, he met ex-Free guitarist Paul Kossoff and, together with Wilson and Montgomery from his former band, Bloontz, they formed Back Street Crawler. The band also included Terry Wilson-Slesser on vocals and later John "Rabbit" Bundrick, who replaced Montgomery on keyboards following the release of the band's first album The Band Plays On (Atco Records). They recorded a further album 2nd Street prior to Kossoff's death in 1976 after which the band decided to stay together. They added Geoff Whitehorn on guitar, and shortened its name to Crawler. This incarnation of the band moved to Epic Records, recorded two more albums, and embarked on several America tours, sometimes supporting stadium acts such as Kansas and Foreigner, Rush, and Robin Trower.

In 1979, Braunagel relocated to Los Angeles where he found work touring and recording with artists such as Eric Burdon, Rickie Lee Jones and Bette Midler. In 1984, Braunagel took the drum stool in Bonnie Raitt's band, playing on the albums Nick of Time and Luck of the Draw, and touring with her until the early 1990s.  He also spent several years touring with Taj Mahal and The Phantom Blues Band.

Braunagel's live performance career included work with such artists as Ivan Neville, Etta James, Eric Burdon, Robert Cray, Bonnie Raitt, B.B. King, John Lee Hooker, Jimmie Reed, Rickie Lee Jones, Bette Midler, Buddy Guy, Coco Montoya, Curtis Salgado, Lyle Lovett, Taj Mahal, Lightnin’ Hopkins, Jack Mack and the Heart Attack, Crawler, Back Street Crawler, Clover, Paul Kossoff, Andy Fraser, Tommy Dardar, Katey Sagal, Charles Brown, Koko Taylor, Billy Vera (Billy and the Beaters), John Cleary, Mike Zito, Billy Thompson, Phantom Blues Band, Leo Nocentelli, George Porter Jr., Roy Gaines, Chris Cain, and BW Stephenson. He also performed Blues Foundation and House of Blues house band shows with guests such as Dr. John, Little Milton, Rufus Thomas, Otis Clay, and Carla Thomas.  

In addition to playing drums and producing music, Braunagel is also a songwriter. He is a Blues Music Award winner. He has been nominated for Blues Music Award in the 'Best Instrumentalist – Drums' category twelve times winning in 2018 Braunagel's recording credits include film scores and television shows as well as numerous albums as a musician, songwriter and producer. In the mid-1990s, Braunagel also produced several commercial jingles. In 2017, Braunagel appears on MEG Records/Nashville artist Tom Maclear's Gods and Ghosts.

Music production and music awards 
Throughout the 1990s, Braunagel played on many award-winning albums. Braunagel has also produced over 20 artists in connection with more than 40 albums. Sessions include drumming on two Grammy Award-winning albums by Taj Mahal and The Phantom Blues Band – Señor Blues and Shoutin' in Key,(Grammy winner, BMA winner) the latter of which Braunagel produced.  His recordings with Taj Mahal and the Phantom Blues Band also won the 2001 W.C. Handy award for Band of the Year. Braunagel also recorded on Buddy Guy's Feels Like Rain (Grammy, Best Contemporary Blues Album, 1994), Bonnie Raitt's Nick of Time (Grammy, Album of the Year, 1989), Bonnie Raitt's Luck of the Draw (Grammy, Album of the Year, 1991), and on Trampled Under Foot's Badlands (BMA Contemporary Blues Album of the Year, 2014) which he also produced.

In addition, Braunagel produced and performed on Hard Truth and Coming in Hot with Coco Montoya; My Secret Life, 'Til Your River Runs Dry, Soul of a Man with Eric Burdon; Karen Lovely's 2015 album, Ten Miles of Bad Road. (BMA Nominee, Blues411 "Jimi" Award winner), and Cry No More (Grammy nominee) with Danielle Nicole.  In 2019 Braunagel produced Nick Schnebelen's album, Crazy All By Myself. He also co-produced and performed on Curtis Salgado's albums Clean Getaway (BMA nominee), Soul Shot (BMA winner), and The Beautiful Lowdown (BMA winner),

Discography

Acting 
From 2001 to 2009, Braunagel had a recurring role as an actor and a drummer on the ABC sitcom, According to Jim, starring Jim Belushi, appearing in around 40 episodes.

Current 
Braunagel resides in the Los Angeles area, where he performs and continues to produce music recordings. As of March 2020, he was working on recording projects with Phil Colombato, T Bear, Deb Ryder, Diunna Greenleaf, and Chris Dowd.  Braunagel regularly performs music in the Los Angeles area with artists such as Paulie Cerra, Billy Vera (Billy and the Beaters), the Bonedaddys. Also in Los Angeles and elsewhere in the United States and abroad, he regularly performs with Taj Mahal, Blues Brothers, Phantom Blues Band, and Darlene Love.

References

External links

Year of birth missing (living people)
Living people
Musicians from Houston
Record producers from Texas
Songwriters from Texas
American rock drummers
Back Street Crawler (band) members
Crawler (band) members